Frye Mesa Reservoir is located in southeastern Arizona,  southwest of Safford in the Coronado National Forest.

Fish species
 Rainbow Trout
 Brown Trout
 Brook Trout
 Gila Trout

References

External links
 
 Arizona Fishing Locations Map
 Arizona Boating Locations Facilities Map
 Frye Mesa Reservoir

Reservoirs in Graham County, Arizona
Coronado National Forest
Reservoirs in Arizona